Ipstones is a civil parish in the district of Staffordshire Moorlands, Staffordshire, England. It contains 96 listed buildings that are recorded in the National Heritage List for England. Of these, four are at Grade II*, the middle of the three grades, and the others are at Grade II, the lowest grade.  Apart from the village of Ipstones, the parish is almost completely rural.  The Caldon Canal passes through and ends in the parish, and the listed buildings associated with it are three bridges, a lock, a milestone and a milepost.  A high proportion of the other listed buildings are houses, cottages and associated structures, farmhouses and farm buildings.  The rest of the listed buildings include churches and a chapel, items in a churchyard, a road bridge, a former tramway terminus, a former warehouse, road mileposts, public houses, a hand pump, and a telephone kiosk.


Key

Buildings

References

Citations

Sources

Lists of listed buildings in Staffordshire